Kougri is a village in the Zam Department of Ganzourgou Province in central Burkina Faso. It has a population of 4110.

References

Populated places in the Plateau-Central Region
Ganzourgou Province